Michael Waddell is a clarinetist, saxophonist, and composer. He is a member of the faculty of the University of North Carolina at Wilmington department of music. He performed in the Dukes of Dixieland band in the 1980s. His 2001 jazz CD, Defining Moments, received positive reviews from JazzTimes and The News & Observer.

References

University of North Carolina at Wilmington faculty
Year of birth missing (living people)
Living people
Place of birth missing (living people)
East Carolina University alumni
American jazz clarinetists